Ultrasound is sound with frequencies greater than 20 kHz. This frequency is the approximate upper audible limit of human hearing.

Ultrasound or ultrasonic may also refer to:

Imaging and measurement 
Medical ultrasonography, an ultrasound-based diagnostic imaging technique
Ultrasound computer tomography, utilizing ultrasound waves as physical phenomenon for imaging
Ultrasound tongue imaging, imaging technique
Ultrasound transmission tomography, a form of tomography involving ultrasound

Media and art 
Ultra-Sonic (band), a Scottish dance group
Ultrasonic (film), a 2012 American independent film
Ultrasound (film), a 2021 American science fiction film
Ultrasonics (journal), a bimonthly peer reviewed scientific journal
Ultrasound (band), a rock band

Other uses 
Ultrasonic antifouling, a technology that helps reduce fouling on underwater structures
Ultrasonic cavitation device, a surgical device to dissect or fragment tissues with low fiber content
Ultrasonic cleaning, ultrasound and an appropriate solvent to clean items
Ultrasonic drug delivery, ultrasound to enhance the transport of molecules into or through biological tissue
Ultrasound energy, mechanical energy called sound characterized by vibrating or moving particles within a medium
Ultrasonic grating, diffraction grating produced by interfering ultrasonic waves
Ultrasonic hearing, auditory effect which allows humans to perceive sounds of a much higher frequency than would ordinarily be audible
Ultrasonic horn, a tapering metal bar commonly used for augmenting the oscillation displacement amplitude
Ultrasonic motors, a type of motor that utilizes ultrasonic vibrations
Ultrasonic sensors, and transducers which use ultrasound to measure distance and velocity
Ultrasonic soldering, a flux-less soldering process that uses ultrasonic energy
Ultrasonic testing, a technique of non-destructive testing
Ultrasonic thickness gauge, a measuring instrument for the non-destructive investigation of a material's thickness
Ultrasonic welding, ultrasonic acoustic vibrations to create a solid-state weld
Ultrasound avoidance, reflex displayed by certain animal species that are preyed upon by echolocating predators
Gravis Ultrasound, a sound card for the PC

See also